Yalıköy may refer to several places in Turkey:

Yalıköy (Beykoz)
Yalıköy, Didim
Yalıköy, Istanbul